Johan "Jan" Mulder (born 4 May 1945) is a Dutch former footballer, writer, columnist, and TV personality.

Early life 
Johan Mulder was born on 4 May 1945 in Bellingwolde in the Netherlands.

Football career 

Mulder was a football striker and played for R.S.C. Anderlecht and AFC Ajax. He also played five matches for the Netherlands, scoring once. Mulder was topscorer of the 1966–67 season in the Belgian Eerste Klasse. His son Youri also grew up to become a football player, spending most of his career in the German Bundesliga at FC Schalke 04 until he retired in 2002.

Honours 
Anderlecht

 Belgian First Division: 1965–66, 1966–67, 1967–68, 1971–72
 Belgian Cup: 1971–72
 Inter-Cities Fairs Cup runner-up: 1969–70

Ajax

 Eredivisie: 1972–73
 European Cup: 1972–73
 Intercontinental Cup: 1972
 European Super Cup: 1973

Individual

 Belgian First Division Top Scorer: 1966–67

Writer and commentator 
After his football career had ended, Mulder became a well-known writer, columnist and television-personality in the Netherlands, making his debut analysing a match of the Netherlands national football team broadcast by TV channel RTL4 in 1996. From that point onwards he would frequently guest star in the RTL4 shows by Frits Barend and Henk van Dorp, who presented both football-related programmes as well as talkshows concerning more political and social/public subjects. After having been a daily guest-star on the show Villa BvD, a football show during the 1998 World Cup in France (also hosted by Frits Barend and Henk van Dorp), Mulder made more and more TV appearances until finally becoming daily guest-star on the late-night talkshow Barend & Van Dorp since March 1999, until the show stopped in April 2006.

The final season of Barend & Van Dorp was shown on the channel Talpa, who had bought the programme from RTL4 during the summer of 2005. Jan Mulder also frequently appeared on another show that was broadcast by Talpa; Eredivisie – De Wedstrijden, which aires several times a week and shows highlights of the Dutch Football League (the Eredivisie). After Barend & Van Dorp Mulder became a weekly side kick in De Wereld Draait Door.

Mulder has also written several works, ranging from ultra-short stories to novels. Most people will associate his name with CaMu, the partnership between Remco Campert (Ca) and Jan Mulder (Mu) that has been writing daily front-page columns for national newspaper de Volkskrant since 1995. These columns are traditionally bundled into books entitled CaMu Jaaroverzicht at the end of each year.

Bibliography 
 1978: Opmars der strafschopgebieden
 1982: De eeuwige reserve
 1984: Sportjournalistiek bestaat niet
 1987: De toespraken
 1988: Diva in Winschoten (short stories)
 1992: De middagduivel
 1994: De vuurspuger van Ootmarsum
 1994: Fiebelekwinten
 1994: La vase
 1994: Spreek en vergissing (novel)
 1996: Mobieliquette
 1999: Familie-album
 1999: Villa BvD
 2000: Overwinningen & nederlagen
 2001: Spelers en speelsters
 2001: Hollandse Velden
 2002: De vrouw als karretje
 2002: Strafschopgebieden & Reserves
 2002: Opkomst & Ondergang
 2003: Iris
 2009: De analyticus
 2009: Labradoedel
 2010: Chez Stans

References

External links 
 
 Stats 

1945 births
Living people
AFC Ajax players
Association football forwards
Belgian Pro League players
Dutch association football commentators
Dutch expatriate footballers
Dutch expatriate sportspeople in Belgium
Dutch footballers
Dutch republicans
Dutch male writers
Eredivisie players
Expatriate footballers in Belgium
Footballers from Groningen (province)
Netherlands international footballers
People from Westerwolde (municipality)
R.S.C. Anderlecht players